E note may refer to:

eNote, an electronic financial instrument
E (musical note)
eNotes. educational software